Lactivibrio is a genus of bacteria from the family of Synergistaceae with one known species (Lactivibrio alcoholicus). Lactivibrio alcoholicus has been isolated from mesophilic granular sludge from Tokyo in Japan.

References

Synergistota
Bacteria genera
Monotypic bacteria genera